Ismael Fernández de la Cuesta (born 1939) is a Spanish vocalist and musicologist specialising in Gregorian chant.

Fernández de la Cuesta was born in the village of Neila, Burgos, Spain. He entered the Abbey of Santo Domingo de Silos at a young age. After a period of study in France, he returned to direct the abbey choir from 1962 to 1973, when he left monastic life. He was subsequently on the staff of the Madrid Royal Conservatory, where he taught Gregorian Chant until his retirement.

Publications
He has published extensively on subjects related to medieval music.

Recordings
He has made recordings of Gregorian chant, notably Chant, the best-selling classical record of 1994, which features the monks of Santo Domingo de Silos. He also directed performances of Mozarabic chant with the same choir.

Awards
He is a recipient of the Civil Order of Alfonso X, the Wise.

See also
 Chant (Benedictine Monks of Santo Domingo de Silos album)

References

Living people
Academic staff of the Madrid Royal Conservatory
Benedictine scholars
Catholic University of the West alumni
People from the Province of Burgos
Spanish performers of early music
Spanish musicologists
Spanish male singers
Spanish Benedictines
1939 births